Mantegazza is an Italian surname. Notable people with the surname include:

Cristoforo Mantegazza (c.1430–1482), Italian sculptor
Giacomo Mantegazza (1851–1920), Italian painter
Paolo Mantegazza (1831–1910), Italian neurologist, physiologist, and anthropologist
Sergio Mantegazza (born 1927), Swiss businessman, chairman and owner of Globus
Virgilio Mantegazza (1889–1928), Italian fencer
Walter Mantegazza (1952–2006), Uruguayan footballer